

Tuberculosis classification system
The current clinical classification system for tuberculosis (TB) is based on the pathogenesis of the disease.

Health care providers should comply with local laws and regulations requiring the reporting of TB.  All persons with class 3 or class 5 TB should be reported promptly to the local health department. See list of notifiable diseases.

CDC TB classification for immigrants and refugees
The U.S. Citizenship and Immigration Services has an additional TB classification for immigrants and refugees developed by the Centers for Disease Control and Prevention (CDC).  The B notification program is an important screening strategy to identify new arrivals who have a high risk for TB.

See also
 Tuberculosis radiology for CXR details
 Tuberculosis diagnosis

References

Tuberculosis
Tuberculosis Classification System